Cast Paper is a paper crafting technique in which paper fiber or pulp, such as cotton fiber paper, is formed using a mold. The pulp may consist of pure fiber, or be an amalgam of fiber, binder, and filler, such as Papier-mâché.   The technique is employed for in-the-round sculpture as well as bas-relief.

See also
 Art movement
 Creativity techniques
 List of art media
 List of artistic media
 List of art movements
 List of art techniques
 List of most expensive paintings
 List of most expensive sculptures
 List of sculptors

References

Paper art
Artistic techniques
Decorative arts